The 2019 Open de Limoges was a professional tennis tournament played on indoor hard courts. It was the 13th edition of the tournament and part of the 2019 WTA 125K series, offering a total of $125,000 in prize money. It took place at the Palais des Sports de Beaublanc in Limoges, France, from 16 to 22 December 2019.

Singles main draw entrants

Seeds 

 1 Rankings as of 9 December 2019.

Other entrants 
The following players received wildcards into the singles main draw:
  Ekaterina Alexandrova
  Clara Burel 
  Océane Dodin 
  Caroline Garcia
  Chloé Paquet
  Alison Van Uytvanck 

The following players received entry from the qualifying draw:
  Nicole Gibbs 
  Jessika Ponchet
  Isabella Shinikova 
  Yanina Wickmayer

Withdrawals
Before the tournament
  Patricia Maria Țig → replaced by  Liudmila Samsonova
  Heather Watson → replaced by  Pauline Parmentier

Doubles entrants

Seeds 

 1 Rankings as of 9 December 2019.

Other entrants 
The following team received a wildcard into the doubles main draw:
  Amandine Hesse /  Chloé Paquet

Champions

Singles

  Ekaterina Alexandrova def.  Aliaksandra Sasnovich 6–1, 6–3

Doubles

  Georgina García Pérez /  Sara Sorribes Tormo vs.  Ekaterina Alexandrova /  Oksana Kalashnikova 6–2, 7–6(7–3)

References

External links 
 Official website 

2019 WTA 125K series
2019 in French tennis
Open de Limoges
December 2019 sports events in France